Pilocrocis sororalis is a moth in the family Crambidae. It was described by William Schaus in 1920. It is found in Panama and Guatemala.

The wingspan is about 34 mm. The forewings are semihyaline white with dark cupreous-brown markings. The costal edge is pale ochreous, the markings not crossing it except the postmedial line. There is a thick broken basal line, a broad subbasal line and a fine antemedial line, as well as a medial spot from above the cell to a black line along the median. The medial spot above the submedian line is connected on the inner margin with the antemedial line by an inbent line. There is a broad fascia across the discocellular space and the postmedial line is narrow and followed by a narrow white line. The rest of the inner margin to the tornus is broadly shaded by dark and there is a large terminal dark space. The hindwings are semihyaline opalescent white.

References

Pilocrocis
Moths described in 1920
Moths of Central America